The Joliet Public Library (JPL) is the public library system serving the city of Joliet, Illinois. The Joliet Public Library was founded on March 7, 1876 with 750 donated books and Charlotte Akin was the first librarian.  Today the majority of the 300,000 item collection resides in downtown Joliet at the Main Library, in a historic limestone building designed in by Daniel H. Burnham. On April 19, 1989, the library was firebombed.

Locations
The Main Library is located at 150 N. Ottawa St., Joliet, IL 60432. The building, built in 1903, was designed by Daniel Burnham and was expanded to its current size in 1989, the same year as the firebombing.
The Black Road Branch  is located at 3395 Black Rd., Joliet, IL 60431.

Library Board of Trustees
The Joliet Public Library Board is governed by a Board of Trustees. The trustees are appointed by the Mayor for a two-year term. The Library Board of Trustees is responsible for establishing library policy, authorizing services provided by the library, establishing the library budget, hiring the library director, and requesting the collection of the designated library millage.

President - Nancy K. Henricksen
Vice President –  Lynn Poper Samalea
Secretary – Esperanza Chavez
Treasurer – Gail Gawlik
Trustee – Kelly Rohder Tonelli
Trustee – Elaine Bottomly 
Trustee – Emita R. Ostrem
Trustee – Diane M. Harris
Trustee – Dr. Jack Markley

Local history collection
The Joliet Public Library's local history section contains a significant amount of information about the history of Joliet and Will County. Among other things the collection contains a nearly complete collection of Joliet newspapers dating back to the 1860s on microfilm, city directories for the city of Joliet dating back to the 1870s, and high school yearbooks for Joliet Township High School dating back to the early  1900s. The collection is often visited by genealogists from around the world who are researching family from Joliet or Will County.

Firebombing

On April 19, 1989, the Joliet Public Library was firebombed, destroying the non-fiction section of the children's area, closing the entire library for 9 days, and closing the children's section for several months.

References

Education in Joliet, Illinois
Public libraries in Illinois
Library buildings completed in 1903